People with diabetes have a greater chance of developing neuropathy, vascular disease, and infections, especially in the legs, so socks and footwear that reduce or eliminate pressures or hot spots is important. A diabetic sock is a non-restrictive, but close fitting sock which is designed to alleviate pressures on the foot or leg. Typically sufferers of diabetes are the most common users of this type of sock. Diabetes raises the blood sugar level, which can increase the risk of foot ulcers. Diabetic socks are made to be non-restrictive to circulation, but if inclusive of Medical Grade, FDA regulated gradient compression, they may include venous compression for enhanced blood circulation.

Proper diabetic socks also help to manage moisture, a feature which can reduce the risk of infection. Another beneficial feature of diabetic socks is seamless toe-closures to avoid pressure, potential hot spots and blistering.

Varieties
Various sock constructions are available, including cotton blend with stretch tops, non-cotton with antimicrobial properties, compression type, and plain non-binding to allow circulation to flow more freely. Extra wide socks are available for excessive edema. So-called "non-binding" versions should not be loose to the point of having wrinkles, which can cause hot spots. The ideal sock for diabetics will be treated in the fabric fibers with an antimicrobial that lasts the life of the sock. The sock should also have moisture-wicking capabilities to limit secondary problems associated with diabetes.

Diabetic socks may appear like regular socks, and are available in many leg lengths. Although various colors are available, white may be preferable for people with open wounds or sores, as this could alert wearers with compromised sensation to a draining wound. The diabetic socks should fit well, without constricting cuffs, lumps, or uncomfortable seams. Flat seams or seamless designs are preferential as this lowers the risk of chafing and local imprints on the skin. The socks are generally made of material that does not wrinkle. The advice of a podiatrist may be helpful in choosing a diabetic sock.

See also
 Compression stockings, which provide the opposite features
 Diabetic foot
 Diabetic shoe

References 

Diabetes-related supplies and medical equipment
Socks